Code of Honor (May 23, 2016 – December 23, 2022) was an American Thoroughbred racehorse who won the 2019 Dwyer Stakes, Travers Stakes, and Jockey Club Gold Cup, and came second in the 2019 Kentucky Derby. He was euthanized on December 23, 2022, following an inoperable bout of colic.

Racing career

2018: Two-year-old season
Code of Honor won his debut on 18 August 2018 at Saratoga Racecourse, and then came second in the Grade 1 Champagne Stakes on October 6. He stumbled at the beginning of the race but mounted a comeback.

2019: Three-year-old season
On 5 January 2019, Code of Honor came in fifth in the Mucho Macho Man Stakes, then rebounded to win the Grade 2 Fountain of Youth Stakes on March 2, where he defeated future Grade 1 winning sprinter Vekoma. His jockey John Velazquez called it an impressive win.

He then came in third in the Grade 1 Florida Derby on March 30 and second in the Grade 1 Kentucky Derby on May 4. He crossed the finish line third but was placed second after the disqualification of the winner, Maximum Security.

His trainer Claude McGaughey had planned for Code of Honor to take a break if he did not win the Kentucky Derby, and he returned after the time off to win three graded stakes. First was the Grade 3 Dwyer Stakes on July 6.

Code of Honor then won the two biggest races of his career, the first being the Grade 1 Travers Stakes on August 24. He won a stretch duel over three-time Grade 2 winner Tacitus and future Grade 1 winner Mucho Gusto at 4:1 odds.

On September 28, he won the Grade 1 Jockey Club Gold Cup over older horses after original winner Vino Rosso was disqualified. After his two Grade 1 wins, Code of Honor became one of the leading three-year-olds.

His last race of his three-year-old season was the Grade 1 Breeders' Cup Classic on November 2. Code of Honor came seventh at 4:1 odds behind the winner, Vino Rosso.

2020: Four-year-old season
Code of Honor won his first start as a four-year-old in the Grade 2 Westchester Stakes on June 6.

He then placed in four graded stakes races, starting with the Grade 1 Metropolitan Handicap on July 4 where he started with odds of 5:2 and finished third behind the winner Vekoma. He followed up with a fourth place finish in the Grade 1 Whitney Stakes behind the four time Grade 1 winner Improbable.

He finished his four-year-old season with second place finishes in both the Grade 2 Kelso Handicap on September 3 and Grade 1 Clark Stakes on October 27.

2021: Five-year-old season
Code of Honor started his five-year-old season with a fifth place finish in the Grade 1 Pegasus World Cup on 2 January 2021, which was won by three time Grade 1 winner Knicks Go who had previously won the Breeders' Cup Mile.

Code of Honor had a break and is possible to make a comeback on August 4 in the Grade 1 Jockey Club Gold Cup or August 21 in the Grade 3 Philip H. Iselin Stakes.

Pedigree

References

2016 racehorse births
2022 racehorse deaths